John Marshall Harlan High School is the eleventh public high school in the Northside Independent School District of San Antonio, Texas, United States. A part of the Northside Independent School District (NISD), it opened in 2017.

It is named after U.S. Supreme Court justice John Marshall Harlan. It is NISD's 11th comprehensive high school. The  building, with a cost of $110 million, is NISD's largest school campus. It opened on August 28, 2017.

References

External links
 John Marshall Harlan High School
 

Northside Independent School District high schools
Public high schools in Bexar County, Texas
Educational institutions established in 2017
2017 establishments in Texas